Michele Di Pietro (born 11 October 1954) is an Italian former swimmer. He competed in the men's 200 metre breaststroke at the 1972 Summer Olympics.

References

External links
 

1954 births
Living people
Italian male swimmers
Olympic swimmers of Italy
Swimmers at the 1972 Summer Olympics
Swimmers  from Naples
Italian male breaststroke swimmers
20th-century Italian people